Miguel Sayago Martí (born 9 May 1985), commonly known as Miguelín, is a Spanish futsal player who plays for ElPozo Murcia as an Ala.

References

External links
LNFS profile
RFEF profile
UEFA profile
ElPozo Murcia profile

Category:Sportspeople from Palma, Majorcax

1985 births
Living people
Spanish men's futsal players
ElPozo Murcia FS players